In the Bible, Amnon is the eldest son of King David.

Amnon is also the given name of:

Amnon of Mainz, a medieval German rabbi and the subject of a popular legend
Amnon David Ar (born 1973), Israeli painter
Amnon Barzel (born 1935), Israeli curator and author
Amnon Cohen (born 1960), Israeli politician
Amnon Dankner (1946–2013), Israeli newspaper editor and author
Amnon Filippi (born 1969), American professional poker player
Amnon Jackont (born 1948), Israeli author of thrillers, historian and literary editor
Amnon Kapeliouk (1930–2009), Israeli journalist and author
Amnon Krauz (born 1952), Israeli Olympic swimmer
Amnon Linn (1924–2016), Israeli retired politician
Amnon Lipkin-Shahak (1944–2012), Israeli military officer and Chief of Staff and politician
Amnon Lord (born 1952), Israeli journalist
Amnon Netzer (1934–2008), Iranian-Jewish historian, researcher, professor and journalist
Amnon Niv (1930–2011), Israeli architect and urban designer
 Amnon Pazy (1936–2006), Israeli mathematician; President of the Hebrew University of Jerusalem
Amnon Rubinstein (born 1931), Israeli law scholar, politician, and columnist
Amnon Salomon (1940–2011), Israeli film cinematographer
Amnon Sella (born 1934), academic and author
Amnon Straschnov (born 1947), Israeli former judge
Amnon Weiss, Israeli businessman and former Paralympic champion
Amnon Wolman (born 1955), music composer
Amnon Yariv (born 1930), Israeli-American professor of applied physics and electrical engineering at Caltech
Amnon Yitzhak (born 1953), Haredi Israeli rabbi

See also
Arnnon Geshuri, American businessman